Bristersburg Historic District is a national historic district located at Bristersburg, Fauquier County, Virginia.  It encompasses 19 contributing buildings, 1 contributing site, 1 contributing structure, and 1 contributing object in the rural crossroads of Bristersburg.  They include three dwellings, a church, a school, and three stores.  Notable buildings include the Tulloss Brothers Store (c. 1838), Zoar Baptist Church (1852), Bristone House (c. 1912), Compton’s Store (c. 1905), Eskridge House (c. 1850, c. 1890), The Bristersburg School (1910) and Payne's Store (c. 1880).

It was listed on the National Register of Historic Places in 2009.

References

Historic districts in Fauquier County, Virginia
National Register of Historic Places in Fauquier County, Virginia
Historic districts on the National Register of Historic Places in Virginia